The 1996–97 Alabama–Huntsville Chargers ice hockey team represented the University of Alabama in Huntsville in the 1996–97 NCAA Division II men's hockey season.  The team was coached by Doug Ross, who was in his 15th season as head coach, and played their home games at the Von Braun Civic Center.

The Chargers entered the season as the defending Division II National Champions, having defeated Bemidji State in the national championship series.  UAH finished the regular season with 20 wins and 6 losses, including wins over Division I teams Air Force and Mankato State.  At the end of the season, UAH played in the Division II National Championship in a rematch with Bemidji State.  The Chargers lost the two games in Bemidji, Minnesota, by scores of 2–3 and 2–4.

Roster

|}

Schedule and results
 Green background indicates win.
 Red background indicates loss.
 Yellow background indicates tie.

|-
!colspan=12 style=""| Exhibition

|-
!colspan=12 style=""| Regular Season

|-
!colspan=12 style=""| NCAA Division II Championship Series

Player stats

Skaters

Goaltenders

References

Alabama–Huntsville Chargers men's ice hockey seasons
Alabama Huntsville